Stephen Kwaku (born 4 October 1993) is a Ghanaian professional footballer who plays as a goalkeeper for Ghanaian Premier League side Accra Great Olympics. He previously played for Liberty Professionals and Tema Youth.

Career

Early career 
Kwaku played for Dansoman-based side Liberty Professionals during the 2016 Ghanaian Premier League season. He played in 12 league matches that season.

Tema Youth 
Kwaku moved to Tema Youth F.C.ahead of the 2017 Ghanaian Premier League season. He played in 14 league matches but couldn't prevent the club from being relegated into the Ghana Division One League.

Great Olympics 
In 2020, ahead of the 2020–21 Ghana Premier League, he moved to Accra Great Olympics and was named on the club's squad list for the season. He made his debut and kept a clean sheet on 20 December 2020, in a 1–0 win over West African Football Academy. With goalkeepers Saed Salifu and Benjamin Asare being part of the team serving as the 1st and 2nd respectively, he became the third choice goalkeeper and was limited to just one appearance at the end of the first round of the season.

References

External links 

 

Living people
1993 births
Association football goalkeepers
Ghanaian footballers
Tema Youth players
Liberty Professionals F.C. players
Accra Great Olympics F.C. players
20th-century Ghanaian people
21st-century Ghanaian people
Ghana A' international footballers
2022 African Nations Championship players